Prasanta Sinha was an Indian association football player who represented India internationally, and played club football for East Bengal.

Playing career
He was part of the India national team that finished as runners-up at the 1964 AFC Asian Cup in Israel. He won the gold medal with the Indian team managed by Syed Abdul Rahim, at the 1962 Asian Games football final, defeating South Korea 2–1. In club football, he played for East Bengal FC, where he won Calcutta Football League once and IFA Shield three times. Played as a defender through out his entire career, Sinha captained the team in 1967–68.

See also
List of East Bengal Club captains

Death
He died in Kolkata at the age of 75 in 2015.

Honours

India
Asian Games Gold medal: 1962
AFC Asian Cup runners-up: 1964
Merdeka Tournament runner-up: 1964; third-place: 1965, 1966

East Bengal
IFA Shield: 1970

Individual
 East Bengal "Lifetime Achievement Award": 2012

References

2015 deaths
Indian footballers
India international footballers
1964 AFC Asian Cup players
East Bengal Club players
Footballers from Kolkata
Medalists at the 1962 Asian Games
Footballers at the 1962 Asian Games
Footballers at the 1966 Asian Games
Asian Games gold medalists for India
Asian Games medalists in football
Association football defenders
Calcutta Football League players